Marco I. Benevento (born December 19, 1978), is an Italian musician, singer and songwriter. He began his career in the mid-1990s as a singer and musician for rock and heavy metal bands and as a composer of movie soundtracks.

Biography

Trained as a pianist, Benevento began playing the keyboards in a rock band at age 16. In 1998 (using the stage name of "Dust") he founded the doom metal band How Like A Winter (formerly Grand Guignol). They recorded a never-released demo in 1999. In 2001 Benevento and How Like A Winter recorded the Demo-CD The winter's near
and signed with American record label Martyr Music Group with whom he released the album "...Beyond My Grey Wake".

In 2006 Benevento joined the band The Foreshadowing and with them he released 3 albums and toured Europe and the United States.

In 2012 his soundtrack debut with the musical score for Marco Risi's feature film "Cha cha cha".

Marco I. Benevento lives in Rome where he continues to work as a musician and also as a sound designer and actor.

Discography
With How Like A Winter:
The winter's near – (2001)
 ...Beyond My Grey Wake – (2003)

With Kamlath:
 Stronger than frost (2011)

With The Foreshadowing:
 Days of Nothing – (2007)
 Oionos – (2010)
 Second World – (2012)
 Seven Heads Ten Horns – (2016)

With The I:
 Backwards (single) - (2015)

References

External links
The Foreshadowing –  website

1978 births
Italian heavy metal musicians
Italian male songwriters
Living people
Italian classical musicians
Italian male guitarists
People from Campobasso
21st-century Italian  male singers
21st-century guitarists